The  is a historic north–south central highway in Puerto Rico, linking the cities of San Juan and Ponce by way of Río Piedras, Caguas, Cayey, Aibonito, Coamo, and Juana Díaz. It crosses the Cordillera Central. Plans for the road started in the first half of the 19th century, and the road was fully completed in 1898. At the time the United States took possession of Puerto Rico in 1898, the Americans called it "the finest road in the Western Hemisphere."

A portion of the Carretera Central from partway through Caguas to the end of Juana Díaz was listed on the U.S. National Register of Historic Places in 2019.

Route description
The highway runs from the north coast city of San Juan to the south coast city of Ponce via Río Piedras, Caguas, Cayey, Aibonito, Coamo, and Juana Díaz. The highway corridor is now signed as Puerto Rico Highway 14 from Ponce to Cayey, and as Puerto Rico Highway 1 from Cayey to San Juan.

History
In the 1820s, the Spanish colonial government in Puerto Rico, under the direction of Governor Miguel de la Torre took the first steps for building a highway connecting the towns of San Juan and Río Piedras and incorporating temporary wooden bridges for river crossings.

During the 1830s an unpaved wagon road was built linking Ponce, Juana Díaz and Coamo to satisfy the commercial sugar production needs of that area. In 1846 a new masonry bridge was built by Spanish engineer Santiago Cortijo to connect the capital city island of San Juan with the rest of the Puerto Rico mainland. Meanwhile, construction of a 41-kilometer macadam highway between San Juan and Caguas, designed by Colonel engineer Diego Galvez, was begun. Construction of the San Juan-Caguas span was first under the direction of Colonel Tulio O'Neill and was later completed, in 1853, under Commander Santiago Cortijo. After the completion of the bridge over the Río Piedras river in 1853, the construction project completed bridges over Quebrada Frailes in 1855, the Concepción Bridge over Caguas's Río Cañas in 1856, and the bridge over the Caguas's Cagüitas River in 1857.

In 1858 Puerto Rican civil engineer Timoteo Luberza designed the paved highway between Coamo, at the southern foothills of Cordillera Central, and Juana Díaz, its first neighboring town due southwest, for the municipality of Coamo. Three years later, by 1861, a fair portion of this highway had already been completed.

The most challenging segment of Carretera Central, the one involving the mountainous segment between Caguas in the north and Coamo in the south, was built under the 1859 General Highway Plan, a complete highway plan to connect the coastal town with those in the mountainous interior. The plan was approved by the Spanish Crown in 1860 and it included the creation of "first order" and "second order" highways. In 1860, the central government commissioned engineer Niceto Blajot to design the paved version of Carretera Central between Ponce and Juana Díaz, which until then was a dirt and gravel road.

The then-municipal highways connecting Ponce, Juana Díaz and Coamo were made part of the state-run Carretera Central between 1875 and 1880. Meanwhile, the first stretch of road built exclusively under the Delegation of Public Works (equivalent to a department of public works) was the northern mountainside segment between Caguas and Cayey. This segment was started in 1875 and completed in 1881 under the direction of site engineers Raimundo Camprubi and Enrique Gadea-Giraldez. It was designed by engineer Manuel Lopez-Bayo.

On the southern mountainside of Cordillera Central, the stretch from Coamo to Aibonito was designed by Timoteo Luberza in 1861. Construction started in 1874 under Ricardo Campubri. It included 7.5 kilometers of the steep Asomante slopes, and was completed in 1881. The width of the road in this stretch was reduced from 6.5 meters to 6.0 meters, to reduce costs associated with building in such steep terrain. The segment between Aibonito and Cayey was designed by Manuel Lope-Bayo, begun in 1879 and completed in 1886.  It included bridges over Quebrada Honda and Quebrada Toíta. As in the Coamo to Aibonito stretch, the stretch from Aibonito to Cayey has a width of 6.0 meters instead of 6.5 meters. The stretch was so treacherous that it was the last to be completed and the most expensive. It soon acquired the popular name La Piquiña.

Functional by 1886, Carretera Central was the first highway to cross Puerto Rico's east–west mountain range, the Cordillera Central. In 1886, it was a  route with 13 permanent bridges and 33  (housing for road maintenance technicians). Contests were held for which roads had been best maintained, so that workers could be properly recognized and rewarded.

The Arenas Bridge, constructed in 1894 to bring the Carretera Central across the Río de la Plata, was the longest bridge constructed in Puerto Rico under Spanish government.

Macadamized "from end to end...into an almost solid floor," when the United States took possession of Puerto Rico in 1898, the editors of the American Harper's Weekly publication called Carretera Central, which was also known as Carretera Militar, "the finest road in the Western Hemisphere."

The road, spanning the entire length between San Juan and Ponce, was fully completed in 1898 and christened Carretera Central.

Other facts
In 1898, during the Spanish–American War, American forces moved from south to north over the Carretara Central. One bridge was demolished by the Spanish to delay the American advance.

National Register of Historic Places
As one of the first modern roadways in Puerto Rico, being built from 1846 to 1886, and regarded as one of the finest roads in the Americas for years after its completion, a portion was listed on the National Register of Historic Places in 2019.

Major intersections
Note: kilometer markers represent the distance along the current Puerto Rico numbered highways rather than the original Carretera Central.

See also

 List of highways in Ponce, Puerto Rico
 Military road
 Ruta Panorámica
 1953 Puerto Rico highway renumbering

Notes

References

Further reading
 
 Alonso, Feliciano. 2007. Álbum de Puerto Rico. Madrid: Doce Calles: CSIC, Consejo Superior de Investigaciones Científicas. . 
 Archivo General de Puerto Rico. Fondo de Obras Públicas, Serie de Carreteras, Legajo 5582–583, Cajas 2666, 2667, 2669.
 Castro, M. de los A. La construcción de la Carretera Central en Puerto Rico. Thesis. School of Architecture. University of Puerto Rico, Río Piedras. 1969. Chapter 5. 
 Hechavarría, M. Testigos mudos de la vida del caminero. El Nuevo Día. San Juan, Puerto Rico. 3 December 2007. Section: Huellas, p. 69. 
 Informe del Comisionado del Interior de Puerto Rico (Guillermo Esteves) para los años 1918–1919, 456 pp. 
 Meléndez-Muñoz, M. Cuentos de la Carretera Central. Ediciones RVMBOS, Barcelona. 1963. 152 pp. 
 Sibanacan. El inventario y estudio de los valores arquitectónicos-arqueológicos e históricos-social de las casillas de peones camineros de la Isla de Puerto Rico. Informe de progreso para la Oficina Estatal de Preservación Histórica de Puerto Rico. 1990. 
 Sibanacan. El inventario y el estudio del valor arquitectónico-arqueológico e histórico-social de las casillas de peones camineros de la Isla de Puerto Rico, 1844–1954. Informe final para la Oficina Estatal de Preservación Histórica de Puerto Rico. 1991. 
 Fay Fowlie de Flores. Ponce, Perla del Sur: Una Bibliográfica Anotada. Second Edition. 1997. Ponce, Puerto Rico: Universidad de Puerto Rico en Ponce. p. 211. Item 1087. 
 G. Waldo Brown. The New America and the Far East: A Picturesque and Historic Description of These Lands and Peoples. Vol. 8. Boston: Marshall Jones. 1907. (CUTPO).

External links
 Ingenieros de Caminos en Puerto Rico: 1866-1898. Fernando Saenz Ridruejo. "Anuario de Estudios Atlanticos." ISSN 0570-4065. Las Palmas de Gran Canaria (2009). No 55. pp. 311–342. Accessed 7 June 2018.
 Bulletin #354.  "Forests of Porto Rico: Past, Present and Future, and their Physical and Economic Environments." Louis S. Murphy. 20 October 1916. Page 19. (U.S. Dept of Agriculture. Division of Publications. Department Bulletins #351-375. 1917.) Retrieved 8 August 2013.
 Historia de las Carreteras de Puerto Rico: 1857-La Carretera Central. Primera Hora. San Juan, Puerto Rico. 13 March 2006. Retrieved 11 February 2014. 
 
 Castillo, J. A. 1929–1930. Historia de la Carretera Central. Revista de Obras Públicas. Diciembre 1929 a junio 1930.  Accessed 24 July 2020.
 Ortueta-Hilberath, E. de. 2000. Modelos de casillas de peones camineros. Actas Tercer Congreso Nacional de Historia de la Construcción, Sevilla. https://web.archive.org/web/20110905135556/http://gilbert.aq.upm.es/sedhc/biblioteca_digital/Congresos/CNHC3/CNHC3_086.pdf 
 Ministerio de Cultura y Deporte. España. Portal de archivos españoles (PARES).  Accessed 24 July 2020.
 Pumarada O'Neill, Luis and Castro Arroyo, Maria de los Angeles. 1996. La Carretera Central: un viaje escénico a la historia de Puerto Rico. Publicado por el Centro de Investigación de Desarrollo del Recinto Universitario de Mayagüez, para la Oficina Estatal de Preservación Histórica de Puerto Rico.  88 pp. . http://www.edicionesdigitales.info/biblioteca/pumarada.pdf 
 Rivera-Ruiz, A. B. 2001. By the side of the road: an interpretive look at road menders’ houses. M. A. Thesis, College of William and Mary, 79 pp. http://edicionesdigitales.info/biblioteca/tesiscasillasaidabelen.pdf
 José A. Mari Mut. De San Juan a Ponce por la Carretera Central. 2011.  Accessed 24 July 2020.

Highways in Puerto Rico
Roads on the National Register of Historic Places
Infrastructure on the National Register of Historic Places in Puerto Rico
Historic districts on the National Register of Historic Places in Puerto Rico
1886 establishments in Puerto Rico
Transport infrastructure completed in 1886